The List of railway routes in Berlin and Brandenburg provides a list of all railway routes in Brandenburg and Berlin, eastern Germany. This includes Regional-Express, Regionalbahn and S-Bahn Berlin services. In the route tables, the major stations are shown in bold text. Where intermediate stations are not given, these are replaced by three dots "...". The information is up to date to October 2020.

Regional services
The following Regional-Express and Regionalbahn services run through Berlin and Brandenburg.

Berlin S-Bahn

See also 
 List of scheduled railway routes in Germany

External links 
 kursbuch.bahn.de Timetables for all railway routes in Germany

References 

Berlin and Brandenburg
Transport in Berlin
Berlin-related lists
Brandenburg